Daniela Grelui Larreal Chirinos (born 2 October 1973) is a Venezuelan track cyclist. At the 2012 Summer Olympics, she competed in the Women's team sprint for the national team  as well as the women's individual sprint  and the keirin.

Major results

1997
 Track Cycling World Cup Classics
 3rd 500m time trial, Round 1, Cali
1999
 3rd Venezuelan National Road Race Championships, Road Race
2001
 3rd Venezuelan National Road Race Championships, Road Race
2002
 Track Cycling World Cup Classics
 3rd Keirin, Round 4, Cali
2003
 Pan American Games
 2nd Sprint
 2nd Keirin
 Track Cycling World Cup Classics
 1st Keirin, Round 3, Cape Town
 1st Sprint, final individual ranking
 3rd Keirin, final individual ranking
2004
 Track Cycling World Cup Classics
 3rd Keirin, Round 3, Manchester
2005
 Pan American Championships
 1st Keirin
2007
 Track Cycling World Cup Classics
 1st Keirin, Round 3, Los Angeles
2010
 Central American and Caribbean Games
 1st Sprint
 1st 500m time trial
 1st Team sprint (with Angie González)
 1st Keirin

2011
 Pan American Games
 1st Keirin
 1st Team sprint (with Mariaesthela Vilera)
 2nd Sprint
 Pan American Road and Track Championships
 1st Team sprint (with Mariaesthela Vilera)
2012
 Track Cycling World Cup
 3rd Keirin, Round 3, Beijing
 Pan American Road and Track Championships
 1st Team Sprint (with Mariaesthela Vilera)
2014
South American Games
1st  Sprint
1st  Team Sprint (with Mariaesthela Vilera)
2nd  Keirin
Pan American Track Championships
2nd  Team Sprint (with Mariaesthela Vilera)
3rd  Keirin
3rd  Sprint
Central American and Caribbean Games
2nd  Keirin
3rd  Team Sprint (with Marines Chiquinquira Parda Rodriguez)

References

External links
 
 
 
 

1973 births
Living people
Venezuelan female cyclists
Venezuelan track cyclists
Olympic cyclists of Venezuela
Cyclists at the 1992 Summer Olympics
Cyclists at the 1996 Summer Olympics
Cyclists at the 2000 Summer Olympics
Cyclists at the 2004 Summer Olympics
Cyclists at the 2012 Summer Olympics
Pan American Games medalists in cycling
Pan American Games gold medalists for Venezuela
Pan American Games silver medalists for Venezuela
Cyclists at the 2003 Pan American Games
Cyclists at the 2011 Pan American Games
Medalists at the 2003 Pan American Games
Medalists at the 2011 Pan American Games
Central American and Caribbean Games medalists in cycling
Central American and Caribbean Games gold medalists for Venezuela
Central American and Caribbean Games silver medalists for Venezuela
Central American and Caribbean Games bronze medalists for Venezuela
Competitors at the 1998 Central American and Caribbean Games
Competitors at the 2002 Central American and Caribbean Games
Competitors at the 2010 Central American and Caribbean Games
Competitors at the 2014 Central American and Caribbean Games
South American Games medalists in cycling
South American Games gold medalists for Venezuela
South American Games silver medalists for Venezuela
Competitors at the 2014 South American Games
Sportspeople from Maracaibo
20th-century Venezuelan women
21st-century Venezuelan women